Liam O'Brien (born 11 January 1980) is an Irish actor, most notable for his three years playing Ethan Blake on ITV's long-running soap Emmerdale.

Born in Limerick, O'Brien founded Bottom Dog Theatre Company in 2008 with Myles Breen. Following his role in Emmerdale, he joined the cast of Fair City as Paul Brennan. In 2004, he appeared Celebrity Stars in Their Eyes.

In the late Nineties and up to 2007, he worked and toured extensively with Limerick's Island Theatre Company with productions including Borrowed Robes, The Trickster, Our Town, The Taming of the Shrew, Mike Finn’s award-winning Pigtown and playing The Gentleman Caller in The Glass Menagerie. He also appeared in Amalgamotion Theatre Company’s Irish tour of Walking Away.  Dublin Theatre roles include Paris in Romeo and Juliet, Cary Grant in Come Up and See Me Sometime.

O'Brien holds a strong connection with crooning. He played Dean Martin for over two years in the West End tour of  The Rat Pack: Live From Las Vegas in the UK, Europe and US. He regularly performs in the Savoy, Limerick.

References

External links 
 

1980 births
Living people
Irish male television actors
Male actors from Limerick (city)